This is a list of the most successful Russian fashion models'''.

1990s 

List of models who started their modeling careers in 1990s:

Anastasia Khozisova
Inna Zobova
Irina Pantaeva
Tatiana Sorokko

2000s 

List of models who started their modeling careers in 2000s:

Anna Barsukova
Anna Selezneva
Anne Vyalitsyna
Colette Pechekhonova
Daria Strokous
Elena Melnik
Eugenia Mandzhieva
Eugenia Volodina
Inga Skaya
Irina Kulikova
Irina Shayk
Katya Shchekina
Ksenia Kahnovich
Masha Novoselova
Natalia Vodianova
Natalie Glebova
Natasha Poly
Olga Sherer
Polina Kouklina
Ranya Mordanova
Sasha Pivovarova
Tatiana Kovylina
Tatiana Usova
Vlada Roslyakova
Sophia Ponce

2010s 

List of models who started her modeling career in 2010's:

Kate Grigorieva
Kristina Romanova
Lia Pavlova
Nastya Sten
Odette Pavlova
Sasha Luss
Tatiana Kotova
Vika Falileeva
Vita Sidorkina

External links
 Fashion Model Directory
 Наши топ-модели: История международного успеха

Lists of models
Fashion models
Russian models